The discography of Joel Turner, an Australian hip hop singer, songwriter, beatboxer, record producer, and musician, consists of two studio albums, one video album, six singles, and six music videos.

Turner came to prominence after auditioning in the first season of Australian Idol in 2003. His debut album, Joel Turner and the Modern Day Poets, was released as a collaboration in 2004 with hip-hop group, the Modern Day Poets. The lead single "These Kids" reached  on the Australian Top 100 Singles Chart and received platinum certification. Turner released a video album, Joel Turner and the Modern Day Poets with the Beatbox Alliance in 2005 on Dream Dealers.

Later that year, Turner released his second studio album, Out of the Box on Hardwax. The album failed to achieve the commercial success of his debut album, failing to rank on the national chart. The lead single "City of Dreams" reached . As of January 2010, Turner was working on his third studio album and second video album.

Studio albums

Singles

Video albums

Music videos

Notes

References
General

Specific

 
Hip hop discographies
Discographies of Australian artists
Production discographies